Dušan Bogičević (born 28 April 1990 in Smederevo) is a Serbian rower.

External links

1990 births
Living people
Serbian male rowers
European champions for Serbia
European Rowing Championships medalists